Eznik of Kolb, was an Armenian Christian writer of the 5th century.

Biography 
Eznik was born in Koghb (modern-day Tuzluca, Turkey), located in a tributary valley of the Chorokh in the historical province of Tayk, in Northern Greater Armenia.
 
He was a pupil of Catholicos Isaac the Great of Armenia and of Saint Mesrop. At their request he went first to Edessa, then to Constantinople to perfect himself in the various sciences and to collect or copy Syriac and Greek manuscripts of the Bible, and the writings of the Fathers of the Church. He returned to Armenia after the First Council of Ephesus (431).
 
He is probably identical with Eznik, Bishop of the region of Bagrevand, who took part in the Synod of Artashat in 449.

Works 
In addition to his labors in connection with the new version of the Bible and various translations, he composed several works, the principal of which is his remarkable apologetic treatise "Against the Sects" or "On God". It was written between 441 and 449, and contains four parts: 
In the first, against the heathens, Eznik combats the eternity of matter and the substantial existence of evil. 
In the second he refutes the chief doctrines of Parseeism/Zoroastrianism (particularly Zurvanism).
The third is directed against aspects of the beliefs of the Greek philosophers (Pythagoreans, Platonists, Peripatetics, Stoics and Epicureans). This is the only section in which Eznik takes his arguments from the Bible rather than from reason.
The fourth book is an exposition and refutation of Marcionism as a dualist heresy.

An essential theme of the work is on the importance of free will in Christian theology. Eznik displays much acumen and an extensive erudition. Eznik was evidently as familiar with the Persian language (Middle Persian) as with Greek literature. His Armenian diction is of the choicest classical type, although the nature of his subject matter forced him to use quite a number of Greek words. The book also contains many interesting asides, such as Eznik's refutation of astrology and his diversion to the topic of animal behavior and psychology.

The original manuscript of "Against the Sects" is lost: The work survived due to a single medieval transcription copied at the University of Gladzor. This manuscript is currently at the Mesrop Mashtots Institute of Ancient Manuscripts. A copy of the first printing of "Against the Sects" as a book in Smyrna (now Izmir) in 1762 is in the collection at the British Library. The Mechitarists at Venice published an updated edition in 1826 and again in 1865.

Translations

French Translation

A French translation (titled "Réfutation des différentes sectes") by LeVaillant de Florival was published in 1853.

German Translation

A German translation (titled "Eznik von Kolb, Wider die Sekten") by J. M. Schmid was published in 1900.

English Translation

A complete English translation (titled "On God") by Monica Blanchard and Robin Darling Young was published in 1998.

An (abridged) retelling of the work in English (titled "Refutation of the Sects") by Thomas Samuelian was published in 1986 and is available to read online.

References

Bibliography

External links 
 

 Eznik of Kołb Refutation of the Sects in English

Christian writers
5th-century Armenian writers
5th-century Christians
Armenian male writers
Armenian people from the Sasanian Empire